Amy Wickus (born June 25, 1972) is an American former middle-distance runner. She won the 800 metres title at the 1993 Universiade and competed at the World Championships in 1993 and 1995.

Career
Wickus won the 800m title at the 1993 Universiade. On August 4, 1993, she ran 2:00.07 for 800m in Zurich, before going on to reach the semifinals at the 1993 World Championships in Stuttgart. At the 1995 World Championships in Gothenburg, she was eliminated in the heats, missing out on the semifinals by one place.

In June 1996 at the US Olympic Trials, Wickus finished fourth behind Regina Jacobs, Juli Henner and Vicki Huber in the 1500m final, missing out on Olympic selection. On July 5, 1996, she ran 4:06.64 for the 1500m  in Oslo.

International competitions

References

1972 births
Living people
American female middle-distance runners
Universiade gold medalists for the United States
Universiade medalists in athletics (track and field)
Medalists at the 1993 Summer Universiade
21st-century American women